The 1991 Individual Speedway Junior World Championship was the 15th edition of the World motorcycle speedway Under-21 Championships. The event was won by Brian Andersen of Denmark.

World final
September 30, 1991
 Coventry, Brandon Stadium

References

1991
World Individual U-21
Individual Speedway
Speedway competitions in the United Kingdom